The Bektashi Order or Bektashism is an Islamic Sufi mystic order originating in the 13th-century. It is named after the Turkish saint Haji Bektash Veli (d. 1271). The Albanian community is currently led by Baba Mondi, their eighth Bektashi Dedebaba and headquartered in Tirana, Albania.

Bektashism began as a Shia Islamic Sufi order in Anatolia during the Ottoman Empire. In 1876, a Salih Nijazi was appointed as the baba "leader" by prominent Bektashi members. After the foundation of the Turkish Republic, Kemal Atatürk banned religious institutions that weren't part of the Directorate of Religious Affairs. After this, the community's headquarters relocated to Albania. The order became involved in Albanian politics, and some of its members, including Ismail Qemali, were major leaders of the Albanian National Awakening.

Bektashis believe in the Ismah of the Prophets and messengers, the Twelve Imams, the Fourteen Infallibles and the current Dedebabas. In addition to the spiritual teachings of Haji Bektash Veli, the Bektashi order was later significantly influenced during its formative period by the Hurufis (in the early 15th century), the Qalandariyya stream of Sufism, figures like Ahmad Yasawi, Yunus Emre, Shah Ismail, Shaykh Haydar, Nesimi, Pir Sultan Abdal, Gül Baba, Sari Saltik and to varying degrees more broadly the Shia belief system circulating in Anatolia during the 14th to 16th centuries. The mystical practices and rituals of the Bektashi order were systematized and structured by Balım Sultan in the 16th century.

According to a 2005 estimate made by Reshat Bardhi, there are over seven million Bektashis worldwide. Albania is the country with the most Bektashis, where they make up 20% of the Muslim population, and 2.5% of the country's population. Bektashis are mainly found throughout Turkey, the Balkans and among Ottoman-era Greek Muslims communities.

Terminology 
Bektashi Islam is named after Haji Bektash Veli. Collectively, adherents of Bektashi Islam, are called Bektashi Muslims or simply Bektashis.

History

Origins and establishment 
The Bektashiyya originated in Anatolia as the followers of the 13th-century scholar Bektash (d. 1271).

It was originally founded as a Sufi movement. The branch became widespread in the Ottoman Empire, their lodges scattered throughout Anatolia as well as in the Balkans. It became the official order of the Janissary corps, the elite infantry corp of the Ottoman Army. Therefore, they also became mainly associated with Anatolian and Balkan Muslims of Eastern Orthodox convert origin, mainly Albanians and northern Greeks (although most leading Bektashi babas were of southern Albanian origin). In 1826, the Bektashi order was banned throughout the Ottoman Empire by Sultan Mahmud II for having close ties with the Janissary corps. Many Bektashi dervishes were exiled, and some were executed. Their tekkes were destroyed and their revenues were confiscated. This decision was supported by the Sunni religious elite as well as the leaders of other, more orthodox, Sufi orders. Bektashis slowly regained freedom with the coming of the Tanzimat era. After the foundation of the Turkish Republic, Kemal Atatürk shut down the lodges in 1925. Consequently, the Bektashi leadership moved to Albania and established their headquarters in the city of Tirana. Among the most famous followers of Bektashi in the 19th century Balkans were Ali Pasha and Naim Frashëri.

Dedebabate 
After lodges in Turkey were shut down, the order's headquarters moved to Albania. On 20 March 1930, Sali Njazi was elected as the First Dedebaba of the Bektashi community. Njazi established the Bektashi World Headquarters in Tirana. Its construction was finished in 1941 during the Italian occupation of Albania. Njazi promoted Bektashi Islam by introducing major ceremonies at popular tekkes. After he was murdered, Ali Riza succeeded him as the Dedebaba.

Despite the negative effect of the ban of lodges on Bektashi culture, most Bektashis in Turkey have been generally supportive of secularism to this day, since these reforms have relatively relaxed the religious intolerance that had historically been shown against them by the official Sunni establishment.

In the Balkans the Bektashi order had a considerable impact on the Islamization of many areas, primarily Albania and Bulgaria, as well as parts of Macedonia, particularly among Ottoman-era Greek Muslims from western Greek Macedonia such as the Vallahades. By the 18th century Bektashism began to gain a considerable hold over the population of southern Albania and northwestern Greece (Epirus and western Greek Macedonia). Following the ban on Sufi orders in the Republic of Turkey, the Bektashi community's headquarters was moved from Hacıbektaş in central Anatolia, to Tirana, Albania. In Albania, the Bektashi community declared its separation from the Sunni community and they were perceived ever after as a distinct Islamic sect rather than a branch of Sunni Islam. Bektashism continued to flourish until the Second World War. After the communists took power in 1945, several babas and dervishes were executed and a gradual constriction of Bektashi influence began. Ultimately, in 1967 all tekkes were shut down when Enver Hoxha banned all religious practice. When this ban was rescinded in 1990 the Bektashism reestablished itself, although there were few left with any real knowledge of the spiritual path. Nevertheless, many "tekkes" (lodges) operate today in Albania. The most recent head of the order in Albania was Hajji Reshat Bardhi Dedebaba (1935–2011) and the main tekke has been reopened in Tirana. In June 2011 Baba Edmond Brahimaj was chosen as the head of the Bektashi order by a council of Albanian babas. Today sympathy for the order is generally widespread in Albania where approximately 20% of Muslims identify themselves as having some connection to Bektashism.

There are also important Bektashi communities among the Albanian communities of Macedonia and Kosovo, the most important being the Harabati Baba Tekke in the city of Tetovo, which was until recently under the guidance of Baba Tahir Emini (1941–2006). Following the death of Baba Tahir Emini, the dedelik of Tirana appointed Baba Edmond Brahimaj (Baba Mondi), formerly head of the Turan Tekke of Korçë, to oversee the Harabati baba tekke. A splinter branch of the order has recently sprung up in the town of Kičevo which has ties to the Turkish Bektashi community under Haydar Ercan Dede rather than Tirana. A smaller Bektashi tekke, the Dikmen Baba Tekkesi, is in operation in the Turkish-speaking town of Kanatlarci, Macedonia that also has stronger ties with Turkey's Bektashis. In Kosovo, the relatively small Bektashi community has a tekke in the town of Gjakovë and is under the leadership of Baba Mumin Lama and it recognizes the leadership of Tirana.

In Bulgaria, the türbes of Kıdlemi Baba, Ak Yazılı Baba, Demir Baba and Otman Baba function as heterodox Islamic pilgrimage sites and before 1842 were the centers of Bektashi tekkes.

Bektashis continue to be active in Turkey and their semi-clandestine organizations can be found in Istanbul, Ankara and Izmir. There are currently two rival claimants to the dedebaba in Turkey: Mustafa Eke and Haydar Ercan.

A large functioning Bektashi tekke was also established in the United States in 1954 by Baba Rexheb. This tekke is found in the Detroit suburb of Taylor and the tomb (türbe) of Baba Rexheb continues to draw pilgrims of all faiths.

Arabati Baba Teḱe controversy
In 2002, a group of armed members of the Islamic Religious Community of Macedonia (ICM), a Sunni group that is the legally recognized organisation which claims to represent all Muslims in North Macedonia, invaded the Shiʻi Bektashi Order's Arabati Baba Teḱe in an attempt to reclaim this tekke as a mosque although the facility has never functioned as such. Subsequently, the Bektashi Order of North Macedonia sued the government for failing to restore the tekke to the Bektashis, pursuant to a law passed in the early 1990s returning properties previously nationalized under the Yugoslav government. The law, however, deals with restitution to private citizens, rather than religious communities.

The ICM claim to the tekke is based upon their contention to represent all Muslims in the Republic of Macedonia; and indeed, they are one of two Muslim organizations recognized by the government, both Sunni. The Bektashi community filed for recognition as a separate religious community with the Macedonian government in 1993, but the Macedonian government has refused to recognize them.

Beliefs 

Bektashis believe in One God (Allah) and follow all the prophets. Bektashis claim the heritage of Haji Bektash Veli, who was a descended of Ali, Husayn, Zayn and other Imams. Therefore, Bektashis follow the teachings of Haji Bektash, who preached about the Twelve Imams. Bektashis differ from other Muslims by also following the Fourteen Innocents, who either died in infancy or were martyred with Husayn. Abbas ibn Ali is also an important figure in Bektashi Islam, and Bektashi Muslims visit Mount Tomorr to honor him during an annual pilgrimage to the Abbas Ali Türbe on August 20–25.

In addition to the Muslim daily five prayers, Bektashi Muslims have two specific prayers, one at dawn and one at dusk for the welfare of all humanity. Bektashism places much emphasis on the concept of Wahdat-ul-Wujood that was formulated by Ibn Arabi.

Malakat is an important text of Bektashi written by Haji Bektash. Bektashis also follow the Quran and Hadith.

Bektashis follow the modern-day Bektashi Dedebabate, currently headed by Hajji Mondi. Bektashis consider the dedebaba as their leader overseeing the entire branch.

Bektashism is also heavily permeated with Shiite concepts, such as the marked reverence of Ali, The Twelve Imams, and the ritual commemoration of Ashura marking the Battle of Karbala. The old Persian holiday of Nowruz is celebrated by Bektashis as Imam Ali's birthday (see also; Nevruz in Albania).

The Bektashi Order is a Sufi order and shares much in common with other Islamic mystical movements, such as the need for an experienced spiritual guide—called a baba in Bektashi parlance — as well as the doctrine of "the four gates that must be traversed": the "Sharia" (religious law), "Tariqah" (the spiritual path), "Marifa" (true knowledge), "Haqiqah" (truth).

There are many other practices and ceremonies that share similarities with other faiths, such as a ritual meal (muhabbet) and yearly confession of sins to a baba (magfirat-i zunub مغفرة الذنوب). Bektashis base their practices and rituals on their non-orthodox and mystical interpretation and understanding of the Quran and the prophetic practice (Sunnah). They have no written doctrine specific to them, thus rules and rituals may differ depending on under whose influence one has been taught. Bektashis generally revere Sufi mystics outside of their own order, such as Ibn Arabi, Al-Ghazali and Jelalludin Rumi who are close in spirit to them despite many of being from more mainstream Islamic backgrounds.

Poetry and literature 
Poetry plays an important role in the transmission of Bektashi spirituality. Several important Ottoman-era poets were Bektashis, and Yunus Emre, the most acclaimed poet of the Turkish language, is generally recognized as a subscriber to the Bektashi order.

Like many Sufis, the Bektashis were quite lax in observing daily Muslim laws, and women as well as men took part in ritual wine drinking and dancing during devotional ceremonies. The Bektashis in the Balkans adapted such Christian practices as the ritual sharing of bread and the confession of sins. Bektashi mystical writings made a rich contribution to Sufi poetry.

A poem from Bektashi poet Balım Sultan (died c. 1517/1519):

Some important early Bektashi writers who wrote in Turkish, Persian, and Arabic are:
Yunus Emre
Kajgusez Sultan
Fuzuliu
Nesimiu
Pir Sulltan Abdalli
Shah Ismail (Hatai)
Sejjid Ali Sulltan
Viran Father

Some important Albanian Bektashi writers are:
Nasibi Tahir Babai (d. 1835)
Father Abdullah Melçani (d. 1852)
Father Hajji Haqi Ali
Father Selim Ruhi
Father Adem Vexhhi (b. 1841 in Gjakova)
Father Meleq Shëmbërdhenji
Father Ahmet Turani
Father Ali Tomorri
Father Sahu i Matohasanajt
Father Hamzai (1882-1952)

Community hierarchy
Like most other Sufi orders, Bektashism is initiatic, and members must traverse various levels or ranks as they progress along the spiritual path to the Reality. The Turkish names are given below, followed by their Arabic and Albanian equivalents.
First-level members are called aşıks عاشق. They are those who, while not having taken initiation into the order, are nevertheless drawn to it.
Following initiation (called nasip), one becomes a mühip محب.
After some time as a mühip, one can take further vows and become a dervish.
The next level above dervish is that of baba. The baba (lit. father) is considered to be the head of a tekke and qualified to give spiritual guidance (irshad إرشاد).
Above the baba is the rank of halife-baba (or dede, grandfather).
The dedebaba is traditionally considered to be the highest ranking authority in the Bektashi Order. Traditionally the residence of the dedebaba was the Pir Evi (The Saint's Home) which was located in the shrine of Hajji Bektash Wali in the central Anatolian town of Hacıbektaş (aka Solucakarahüyük), known as the Hajibektash complex.

Traditionally there were twelve of these hierarchical rankings, the most senior being the dedebaba (great-grandfather).

Administration 

In Albania, the World Headquarters of the Bektashi divides the country into 6 different administrative districts (similar to Christian parishes and patriarchates), each of which is called a gjyshata.

 The Gjyshata of Gjirokastra (headquarters: tekke of Asim Bab): the regions of Gjirokastra, Saranda and Tepelena.
 The Gjyshata of Korça (headquarters: tekke of Turan): the regions of Korça, Devoll, Pogradec and Kolonja, including Leskovik.
 The Gjyshata of Kruja (headquarters: tekke of Fushë Kruj): the regions of Kruja, Kurbin, Bulqiza, Dibra, Mat, Shkodra and Durrës.
 The Gjyshata of Elbasan (headquarters: tekke of Baba Xhefai): the regions of Elbasan, Gramsh, Peqin, Lushnja, Kavaja, and Librazhd, including Përrenjas.
 The Gjyshata of Vlora (headquarters: tekke of Kusum Bab): the regions of Vlora, Mallakastra, Fier, including Patos and Roskovec.
 The Gjyshata of Berat (headquarters: tekke of Prisht): the regions of Berat, Skrapar and Përmet.

During the 1930s, the six gjyshata of Albania set up by Sali Njazi were:

Kruja, headquartered at the tekke of Fushë-Krujë
Elbasan, headquartered at the tekke of Krasta
Korça, headquartered at the tekke of Melçan
Gjirokastra, headquartered at the tekke of Asim Baba
Prishta, representing Berat and part of Përmet
Vlora, headquartered at the tekke of Frashër

National headquarters in other countries are located in:
 Gjakova, Kosovo
 Tetova, North Macedonia
 Taylor, Michigan, United States

There is also a Bektashi office in Brussels, Belgium.

World Bektashi Congress 

The World Bektashi Congress, also called the National Congress of the Bektashi, a conference during which members of the Bektashi Community make important decisions, has been held in Albania several times. Since 1945, it has been held exclusively in Tirana. The longest gap between two congresses lasted from 1950 to 1993, when congresses could not be held during Communist rule in Albania. A list of congresses is given below.

List of Dedebabas 
This section lists the Dedebabas (Supreme Leaders) of the Bektashi Order.

In Turkey (before 1930) 
List of Bektashi Dedebabas (mostly based in Hacıbektaş, Anatolia), prior to the 1925 exodus of the Bektashi Order from Turkey to Albania:

In Albania (1930–present) 

List of Bektashi Dedebabas following the 1925 exodus of the Bektashi Order from Turkey to Albania:

Religious figures

Gallery

See also

References

Notes

Citations

Bibliography

 

 Doja, Albert. 2006. "A political history of Bektashism from Ottoman Anatolia to Contemporary Turkey." Journal of Church and State 48 (2): 421–450. doi=10.1093/jcs/48.2.423.
 Doja, Albert. 2006. "A political history of Bektashism in Albania." Politics, Religion & Ideology 7 (1): 83–107. doi=10.1080/14690760500477919.
 
 Nicolle, David; UK (1995). The Janissaries (5th). Osprey Publishing. .
 Muhammed Seyfeddin Ibn Zulfikari Derviş Ali; Bektaşi İkrar Ayini, Kalan Publishing, Translated from Ottoman Turkish by Mahir Ünsal Eriş, Ankara, 2007 Turkish
 Saggau, Emil BH. "Marginalised Islam: Christianity’s role in the sufi order of Bektashism." In Exploring the Multitude of Muslims in Europe, pp. 183-197. Brill, 2018.

Further reading
 
 
 Frashëri, Naim Bey. Fletore e Bektashinjet. Bucharest: Shtypëshkronjët të Shqipëtarëvet, 1896; Reprint: Salonica: Mbrothësia, 1909. 32 pp.

External links
 Official website of the Kryegjyshata Botërore Bektashiane (World Headquarters of the Bektashi)
 Videos and documentaries 
 History of the Bektashi Order of Dervishes

 
Alevism
Dervish movements
Islam in Albania
Islam in Bulgaria
Liberal and progressive movements within Islam
Religious organizations established in the 13th century
Shia Islam in Albania
Shia Islam in Turkey
Shia Sufi orders
Turkish words and phrases
Religious organizations based in Bulgaria